Rainbow Reel Tokyo (Japanese: レインボー・リール東京 Reinbō rīru Tōkyō), until 2016 known as Tokyo International Lesbian & Gay Film Festival (Japanese: 東京国際レズビアン&ゲイ映画祭 Tōkyō kokusai rezubian to gei eigasai), also known by the acronym TILGFF, is an international film festival for LGBT audiences, held annually in Tokyo, the capital city of Japan.

The Festival was established in 1992 and was held at Nakano Sun Plaza, 6th Floor (中野サンプラザ６F研修室).  The next three were held at Kichijōji Baus Theater (吉祥寺バウスシアター).  Since 1996, the Festival has been held in July at Spiral Hall in the Aoyama neighborhood of Tokyo.

The 23rd Tokyo International Lesbian & Gay Film Festival was held July 12~21, 2014, at Eurospace in Shibuya, and Spiral Hall in Aoyama.

Awards

Rainbow Reel Competition
The Rainbow Reel Competition (レインボー・リール・コンペティション) began in 1995 as an annual screening of Japanese short films to encourage production of LGBT-themed films.  The audience selects a favorite film and the director is awarded the Grand Prix Rainbow Reel Award (レインボー・リール賞（グランプリ）), currently a ¥100,000 prize ($1000 US).

Grand Prix Rainbow Reel Award winners
 4th Festival (1995) –
 5th Festival (1996) –
 6th Festival (1997) –
 7th Festival (1998) – We Are Transgenders (We Are Transgenders ～性別を超えて、自分らしく生きる～); director: Lulu Ogawa (尾川ルル)
 8th Festival (1999) –
 9th Festival (2000) –
 10th Festival (2001) –
 11th Festival (2002) –
 12th Festival (2003) –
 13th Festival (2004) –
 14th Festival (2005) – "Stereotype Company" (「ヘテロ薬」) (2005); director: Team "Stereotype Company" (ヘテロ薬制作委員会)
 15th Festival (2006) – Somewhere in Tokyo (東京のどこかで) (2006); director: Kenta Tatenai (タテナイケンタ)
 16th Festival (2007) – A Tulip of Violet (2007); director: Yūmi Andō (安藤優美)
 17th Festival (2008) – San-Kaku (△サンカク) (2008); director: Kazuki Watanabe (渡辺一樹)
 18th Festival (2009) – "Avec mon copain / With my Boyfriend; director : Antonio de Oliveira; Producer : Sanae Kikuchi (Tomoé films)
 19th Festival (2010) – Jellyfish Boy (くらげくん) (2009); director: Shō Kataoka (片岡翔)
 20th Festival (2011) –
 21st Festival (2012) – Tsuyako (2011); director: Mitsuyo Miyazaki (宮崎光代)
 22nd Festival (2013) – 
 23rd Festival (2014) – The Other Side of a Smiling Face (笑顔の向こう側) (2013); director: Yoshiaki Sajima (佐島由昭)
 24th Festival (2015) – From the Bottom of the Vortex (私は渦の底から) (2015); director: Kozue Nomoto (野本梢)
 25th Festival (2016) –
 26th Festival (2017) –
 27th Festival (2018) – Old Narcissus (老ナルキソス); director: Tsuyoshi Shōji (東海林毅)
 28th Festival (2019) –

Special Jury Award
The Special Jury Award (審査員特別賞 Shinsa-in tokubetsu shō), first given in 2008, is an outstanding Japanese film selected by a guest director.

Special Jury Award winners
 17th Festival (2008) – When I Become Silent (わたしが沈黙するとき) (2007); director: Hyōe Yamamoto (山本兵衛)

Festival programs

1st Festival (1992)
Festival reference

2nd Festival (1993)
Festival reference

3rd Festival (1994)
Festival reference

4th Festival (1995)
Festival reference

5th Festival (1996)
Festival reference

6th Festival (1997)
Festival reference

7th Festival (1998)
Festival reference

8th Festival (1999)
Festival reference

9th Festival (2000)
Festival reference

10th Festival (2001)
Festival reference

11th Festival (2002)
Festival reference

12th Festival (2003)
Festival reference

13th Festival (2004)
Festival reference

14th Festival (2005)
Festival reference

15th Festival (2006)
Festival reference

16th Festival (2007)
Festival reference

17th Festival (2008)
Festival reference

18th Festival (2009)
Festival reference

19th Festival (2010)
Festival reference

20th Festival (2011)
Festival reference

21st Festival (2012)
Festival reference

22nd Festival (2013)
Festival reference

23rd Festival (2014)
Festival reference

24th Festival (2015)
Festival reference

25th Festival (2016)
Festival reference

26th Festival (2017)
Festival reference

27th Festival (2018)
Festival reference

See also
 List of LGBT film festivals

References

External links
 Official Website

Recurring events established in 1992
1992 establishments in Japan
LGBT culture in Tokyo
LGBT film festivals in Japan
Film festivals in Tokyo
Summer events in Japan